Scutellastra flexuosa is a species of sea snail, a true limpet, a marine gastropod mollusc in the family Patellidae, one of the families of true limpets.

Description
The length of the shell attains 25.4 mm.

Distribution
This marine species occurs off Mauritius and Vanikoro (Solomon Island).

References

 Nakano T. & Ozawa T. (2007). Worldwide phylogeography of limpets of the order Patellogastropoda: molecular, morphological and paleontological evidence. Journal of Molluscan Studies 73(1): 79–99.

External links
 Quoy, J. R. C. & Gaimard, J. P. (1832-1835). Voyage de la corvette l'Astrolabe : exécuté par ordre du roi, pendant les années 1826-1827-1828-1829, sous le commandement de M. J. Dumont d'Urville. Zoologie.
 Reeve, L. A. (1841-1842). Conchologia Systematica, or complete system of conchology; in which the Lepades and conchiferous Mollusca are described and classified according to their natural organization and habits. Longman, Brown, Green, & Longman's, London. Vol. 1: 1-195, pls 1-129; Vol. 2: 1-338, pls 130-300
 Deshayes, G. P. (1863). Catalogue des mollusques de l'île de la Réunion (Bourbon). Pp. 1-144. In Maillard, L. (Ed.) Notes sur l'Ile de la Réunion. Dentu, Paris
  Reeve, L. A. (1854-1855). Monograph of the genus Patella. In: Conchologia Iconica, or, illustrations of the shells of molluscous animals, vol. 8, pls 1-42 and unpaginated tex. L. Reeve & Co., London.
 Gould, A.A. 1846. New shells, collected by the United States Exploring Expedition, and belong to the genus Patella. Proceedings of the Boston Society of Natural History 2: 148-152
 Iredale, T. (1929). Queensland molluscan notes, No. 1. Memoirs of the Queensland Museum. 9(3): 261-297, pls 30-31
 Hombron, J. B. & Jacquinot, C. H. (1841). Description de quelques mollusques provenant de la campagne de l'Astrolabe et de la Zélée. Annales des Sciences Naturelles, ser. 2, Zoologie. 16: 62-65, 190-192
 Koufopanou, V., Reid, D.G., Ridgeway, S.A., & Thomas, R.H. (1999). A molecular phylogeny of the patellid limpets (Gastropoda: Patellidae) and its implications for the origins of their antitropical distribution. Molecular Phylogenetics and Evolution. 11(1): 138-156

Patellidae
Gastropods described in 1834